The boys' doubles event of the 2017 BWF World Junior Championships was held on 16–22 October. The defending champions were Han Chengkai and Zhou Haodong from China.

Seeds 

  Kang Min-hyuk / Kim Won-ho (semifinals)
  Su Li-wei / Ye Hong-wei (second round)
  Krishna Prasad Garaga / Dhruv Kapila (fourth round)
  Mahiro Kaneko / Yunosuke Kubota (champion)
  Wachirawit Sothon / Natthapat Trinkajee (quarterfinals)
  Nhat Nguyen / Paul Reynolds (third round)
  Eloi Adam / Samy Corvee (third round)
  Christopher Grimley / Matthew Grimley (fourth round)

  Adam Gozzi / Carl Harrbacka (second round)
  Chen Sihang / Fan Qiuyue (fourth round)
  Rinov Rivaldy / Yeremia Rambitan (semifinals)
  Georgii Karpov / Mikhail Lavrikov (second round)
  Di Zijian / Wang Chang (final)
  Julien Carraggi / Jona van Nieuwkerke (second round)
  Thom Gicquel / Leo Rossi (fourth round)
  Fabio Caponio / Giovanni Toti (third round)

Draw

Finals

Top half

Section 1

Section 2

Section 3

Section 4

Bottom half

Section 5

Section 6

Section 7

Section 8

References

2017 BWF World Junior Championships